The Pittsburgh Panthers men's basketball team is the NCAA Division I intercollegiate men's basketball program of the University of Pittsburgh, often referred to as "Pitt", located in Pittsburgh, Pennsylvania. The Pitt men's basketball team competes in the Atlantic Coast Conference (ACC) and plays their home games in the Petersen Events Center. The Panthers were retroactively recognized as the pre-NCAA tournament national champion twice by the Helms Athletic Foundation and once by the Premo-Porretta Power Poll. Pitt has reached one Final Four, received 15 First Team All-American selections, appeared in 27 NCAA tournaments through the 2022–23 season, and has recorded 1,674 victories against 1,232 losses since their inaugural season of 1905–06.

History

Initial era
The University of Pittsburgh began playing men's basketball in 1905–06 under coach Benjamin Printz. The University did not field a team during the 1909–10 and 1910–11 seasons. The program was resurrected in 1911 under head coach Walter "Dutch" Wohlfarth, and the following year Dr. George M. Flint assumed head coaching duties and began rebuilding Pitt's program essentially from the ground up. Flint led the Panthers to eight winning seasons during his ten years at the helm and coached future Pitt coach H. C. Carlson.

H.C. "Doc" Carlson era (1922–1953)
Henry Clifford "Doc" Carlson, MD took over as coach in 1922 and soon turned Pitt into a national power. In the era preceding the initiation of national tournaments, the Panthers were both contemporaneously and later retroactively, by the Helms Athletic Foundation (1927–28 and 1929–30) and the Premo-Porretta Power Poll (1927–28), regarded as national champions. Those teams were led by National Player of the Year, 3-time All-American and Naismith Basketball Hall of Fame inductee Charlie Hyatt. Carlson was a ground-breaking coach who would be inducted into the Naismith and Helms Foundation Basketball Hall of Fames. In the late 1920s, Carlson initiated playing a "national schedule" by taking his teams on midwestern road trips that included games against several Big Ten schools and, in 1931, is credited as the first coach to take an Eastern team out west. He also developed the widely emulated Figure Eight Offense and also experimented with various conditioning techniques, including the use of oxygen on the bench.  Under Carlson, and led by two-time All-American Claire Cribbs, Pitt continued success through the 1930s winning four Eastern Intercollegiate Conference championships. In 1935, Pitt, as Eastern Intercollegiate champions representing the best of the East, lost a 41–37 season-ending contest to SEC champion LSU in the American Legion Bowl in Atlantic City, a game on which LSU bases its claim on that season's national championship. On February 28, 1940, Pitt played in the first-ever televised basketball game, a 57–37 victory over Fordham at Madison Square Garden that was televised by NBC station W2XBS.  Carlson also led Pitt to its first-ever NCAA appearance en route to the 1941 NCAA Final Four. Carlson's tenure at Pitt's helm lasted for 30 consecutive years before he retired following the 1952–53 season.

Pitt moved their competition into the Fitzgerald Field House in 1951, leaving the Pitt Pavilion, housed inside of Pitt Stadium.  Pitt would continue to play in the Fieldhouse until 2002.

Bob Timmons era (1953–1968)
Robert Timmons took over as head coach from Carlson for the 1953–54 season and led by two-time All-American and Helms Foundation Basketball Hall of Fame inductee Don Hennon, appeared in two NCAA tournaments during the late 1950s. Timmons also led Pitt to an NCAA appearance in 1963 and its first NIT appearance in 1964.

Buzz Ridl era (1968–1975)

Timmons was succeeded by head coach Charles "Buzz" Ridl who became famous for his 'amoebe' defense, an ever changing man to zone match-up defense. With All-American Billy Knight, Ridl led Pitt to the Elite Eight in 1974, with early round victories over St. Joseph's and Furman. Pitt lost to eventual national champion North Carolina State in the Eastern Regional Final (Elite 8) played in Raleigh, North Carolina amid a hostile local crowd. This Pitt team was filled with local players such as Mickey Martin, Jim Bolla, Tom Richards, Keith Starr, Kirk Bruce and Billy Knight, who went on to star in the ABA for the Indiana Pacers and with several teams in the NBA. Following the graduation of Knight and Martin, Pitt made an NIT appearance the following year, Ridl's last before retiring.

Eastern Eight Conference (1976–1982)
For the 1976–77 season, Pitt began play as a member of the Eastern 8 Conference.

Tim Grgurich era (1975–1980)
Pittsburgh native Tim Grgurich, who was an assistant coach under Ridl, became Pitt's next head coach. He led Pitt into the inaugural 1976–77 season of the Eastern Collegiate Basketball League, which would change its name to the Eastern Eight (forerunner to the Atlantic 10) the following year. That initial year, Larry Harris, a 6'6" forward with an impressive outside shot and an ability to score points in traffic, won the league scoring title. Grgurich also led Pitt to the 1980 NIT.

Roy Chipman era (1980–1986)
Grgurich was succeeded by Lafayette coach Dr. Roy Chipman who began Pitt's rollercoaster-like ride back to national significance. In his first season at the helm, the Panthers won the Eastern Eight Conference tournament. In the 1981 NCAA tournament, Pitt defeated Idaho in overtime in the first round; they lost to North Carolina in the second round. Chipman's Panthers enjoyed similar success the following season, defeating archrival West Virginia for their last Eastern Eight tournament Championship, energized by remarks by WVU Coach Gale Catlett. Pitt lost to Pepperdine in the first round of the 1982 NCAA tournament to end Chipman's second season and Pitt's last as a member of the Eastern Eight Conference.

Big East Conference (1982–2013)
For the 1982–83 season, Pitt began play as a member of the Big East Conference.

Paul Evans era (1986–1994)
Chipman would lead Pitt to three more postseason appearances, he retired from coaching after the 86 season and was replaced by Paul Evans as head coach in 1986–87. Led by All-Americans Charles Smith and Jerome Lane, Pitt would capture its first two regular season Big East Championships and secure several top 10 rankings reaching as high as number two in the nation. However, compared to the expectations of the fans, these teams had disappointing showings in their Big East and NCAA tournaments appearances. After the departures of Smith and Lane, Pitt basketball continued to have a national, if not inconsistent, impact with players such as Sean Miller, Brian Shorter, Jerry McCullough, and Eric Mobley. In eight seasons as head coach Evans' teams advanced to a total of five NCAA tournaments and one NIT.

Ralph Willard era (1994–1999)
Slumping play led to Evans' departure, and he was replaced by Ralph Willard who headed the Pitt program from 1994–95 through 1998–99. Despite highly regarded recruiting classes and stars such as Mark Blount and Vonteego Cummings, Pitt advanced to only one NIT in five seasons under Willard.

Ben Howland era (1999–2003)
Ben Howland was hired as head coach of the Panthers in 1999–00 and led them to sustained success for 4 seasons. In Howland's second season (2000–01), the Pitt team, led by senior standout Ricardo Greer and All-American guard Brandin Knight, advanced to the Big East tournament championship game and NIT. In Howland's third (2001–02) and fourth (2002–03) seasons, Pitt won back-to-back Big East regular season championships, appeared in back-to-back Big East tournament championship games and won the Big East tournament in 2003. Pitt advanced to consecutive NCAA tournament Sweet Sixteens (2002, 2003). For his success in the 2001–02 season, Howland was named the Big East Coach of the Year, Naismith College Coach of the Year, and won the Henry Iba Award as best college basketball coach as named by the United States Basketball Writers Association. Following the 2003 season, Howland left Pitt for the only job he said he would ever contemplate leaving Pitt for: the head coach position at UCLA.

In 2002, Pitt began their first season of play at the 12,508-seat Petersen Events Center which sits on the former site of Pitt Stadium. The first opponent at "the Pete", as the facility is called by students, was against cross-city rival Duquesne University.

Atlantic Coast Conference (2013–present)
For the 2013–14 season, Pitt began play as a member of the ACC.

Jamie Dixon era (2003–2016)

Jamie Dixon, Howland's assistant at Northern Arizona and Pitt, was named head coach of the team in 2003. Under Dixon, the Panthers continued the progress begun under Howland, registering a third straight Big East regular season championship (2004), a fourth straight appearance in the Big East tournament championship game (Pitt 58, UConn 61) and a third straight appearance in the NCAA tournament Sweet Sixteen. With Dixon at the helm, Pitt's success continued with frequent national rankings, four Big East tournament championship game appearances in five seasons (2004, 2006, 2007 2008), a Big East tournament Championship in 2008, and NCAA tournament appearances in nine of ten years under Dixon's leadership (2004–11, 2013), including trips to the Sweet Sixteen (2004, 2007, 2009) and Elite Eight (2009).

The 2008–09 season was notable for several historic accomplishments. The Panthers were ranked #1 in the Associated Press poll and ESPN/USA Today Coaches' poll for the first time in school history, claiming the #1 spot for a total of three weeks. On February 16, 2009, the #4 ranked Panthers defeated the #1 ranked UConn Huskies, 76–68, for Pitt's first-ever win versus a #1 ranked team. The Panthers repeated the feat on March 7, 2009, when the #3 ranked Panthers again defeated #1 ranked UConn again, 70–60, for Pitt's second-ever win versus a #1 ranked team. In doing so, Pitt became only the seventh school in NCAA Division I history to defeat two #1 ranked teams in the same season. On Selection Sunday, March 15, 2009, the Panthers received their first ever No.1 seed (East Region) in the 2009 NCAA tournament. They reached the Elite Eight for the first time since 1974. Pitt's 76–78 last second loss to fellow Big East Conference foe Villanova in the East Regional final for a trip to the Final Four became an instant classic. In 2009, Dixon broke the record for the most victories in the first six seasons as a Division I head coach and won the Naismith Coach of the Year award.

The success of the 2008–09 season continued over to the 2009–10 season, somewhat unexpectedly. Having lost the talents of Sam Young, DeJuan Blair and Levance Fields, the Panthers were picked in a pre-season Big East poll to finish ninth in the conference. Instead, Pitt earned a 13–5 Big East record, good enough for a second seed in the Big East tournament, received a third seed in the NCAA tournament, and finished 25–9 overall record. In 2010–11, Pitt won the regular season Big East title and, for a second time in the program's history, earned a #1 seed in the NCAA tournament.

The program achieved a school record 10-straight seasons with at least 20 overall wins, 10 conference wins, and an NCAA Tournament appearance from 2002 through 2011. Dixon, who has been named as a national coach of the year in three separate seasons, guided Pitt to NCAA Tournament appearances in his first eight seasons as head coach, and is the only head coach in school history to guide Pitt to eight NCAA Tournament appearances (2004–2011).

The Atlantic Coast Conference announced in September 2011 that Pitt and Syracuse would be leaving the Big East and had been accepted as members of the ACC, which would grow from 12 to 14 teams. Pitt officially joined the ACC on July 1, 2013.

In 2011–12, Pitt failed to qualify for the NCAA tournament, but managed to again surpass 20 wins for the 11th consecutive season and qualify for the College Basketball Invitational for a 12th consecutive post-season appearance. Pitt defeated Washington State in the Finals in a best 2 out of 3 format to win the post-season tournament.

Dixon's record at Pitt stood at 262 wins and 86 losses (.753 win percentage) in ten seasons (2003–04 through 2012–13), second in school history behind only Carlson. His league record of 127–66 in ten seasons made him the winningest coach in Big East history with a .658 winning percentage in league games and tournaments. .

On March 31, 2010, Pitt extended Dixon's contract by two years, making him Pitt's head coach through 2017–18 season. Dixon signed another contract extension on March 23, 2013. This extension ran through the 2022–2023 season. Upon the extension, Dixon commented saying that his intentions were to "finish his career at the University of Pittsburgh." Dixon, however, departed to take the head coaching position at his alma mater, TCU, on March 21, 2016, after Pitt grew dissatisfied with his team's results and  lowered his contract buyout clause to make it easier for him to leave.

Kevin Stallings era (2016–2018)
On March 28, 2016, the school hired Vanderbilt head coach Kevin Stallings to fill the vacant head coaching position. Pitt went 16–17 and finished 14th in the ACC, its first losing season in 17 years. The Panthers notably lost to Duquesne for the first time since 2000 and suffered a 106–51 loss to Louisville, their worst loss since 1906.  The disappointing season was punctuated by a blowout home loss to #1 Virginia on senior night, during which the Panthers managed only 7 first half points against the Cavaliers.  In Stallings second season Pitt went 8–24 and went 0–18 in ACC conference play. Pitt finished 15th and last in the conference. On March 8, 2018, Pitt fired Stallings.

Jeff Capel era (2018–present)
On March 27, 2018, Duke associate head coach Jeff Capel reached an agreement to become the 16th head basketball coach at Pitt. Capel previously served as head coach at VCU (2002–06) and Oklahoma (2006–11).

Traditions

Student section

Rivalries

West Virginia 
The fiercest rivalry was with former Big East Conference member West Virginia University in the basketball version of the Backyard Brawl, an extension of the football rivalry.  Adding to the importance of the game, Pitt and West Virginia shared membership in the Eastern Intercollegiate Conference (1933–1939), the Eastern Collegiate Basketball League West Division (1977), Eastern 8 Conference (1978–1982), and the Big East Conference (1996–2012). In addition, the two rivals have tangled in the last games played at three of their respective arenas: on February 26, 1951, Pitt defeated WVU 74–72 in the closing seconds of the last college game played at the Pitt Pavilion inside Pitt Stadium; on March 3, 1970, Pitt upset WVU 92–87 in the last game played at the West Virginia University Field House in Morgantown; and on March 2, 2002, Pitt defeated WVU 92–65 in Pitt's last game at Fitzgerald Field House. The two teams last met on February 16, 2012, resulting in a 66–48 Mountaineer victory. The Panthers and Mountaineers are scheduled to resume their annual series as part of the nonconference schedule beginning with the 2017–18 season, ending a 5-year absence. Pitt will host games in 2017 and 2019, while WVU will host games in the 2018 and 2020 seasons. WVU remains as Pitt's most-played opponent, with 184 meetings having been played between the schools as of the end of the 2011–12 season.  West Virginia leads the series 98 to 88.

Penn State 
Another spill-over from the gridiron, the Panthers' third-most frequently-played opponent is the Penn State Nittany Lions, whom they have played 148 times. Penn State leads the all-time series, 76–72. They played at least once every year from 1935–82 and briefly rekindled the rivalry at the turn of the century, playing annually from 2000–05. Since that time, they’ve gone against each other just twice, in 2013 as part of the Big Ten-ACC Challenge, and in the 2016 Never Forget Tribute Classic. They are not scheduled to renew the series in the foreseeable future, though there have been significant talks between the universities about doing so.

Duquesne 
The Panthers also have a sustained rivalry with crosstown opponent Duquesne University in The City Game.  Peaking in ferocity from 1977–1982 when both were members of the Eastern Eight Conference, the rivalry has diminished somewhat since Pitt's move to the Big East Conference in 1982.

Syracuse 
A spillover from their football rivalry, the Panthers and Syracuse University also maintain a rivalry on the hardwood. The series intensified during the first decade of this century, during which both teams were highly competitive in the Big East and made numerous appearances in both the AP Top 10 and NCAA Tournament. They continue to play at least twice each season as members of the ACC.

2-time National Champions
Pitt men's basketball teams of 1927–28 (21–0) and 1929–30 (23–2) were recognized as national champions both popularly and by the Helms Athletic Foundation.  These teams of "Doc" Carlson, led by three-time All-American and two-time National Scoring Champion Charley Hyatt, played a "national" schedule that during the 1927–28 season that included the following wins:

@ Michigan
@ Chicago
@ Northwestern
@ Iowa
Ohio State
 Dartmouth (defending Eastern Collegiate Champions)

Syracuse
@ Army
@ Colgate
Notre Dame
@ West Virginia
@ Penn State

The 1929–30 national championship team racked up wins that included the following:

@ Indiana
@ Northwestern
@ Iowa
Ohio State
Nebraska
Georgetown
@ Montana State (defending national champions)

Notre Dame
Fordham
@ Penn State
West Virginia
@ Temple
@ Army

Although there was no NCAA Tournament at that time, there were contests billed as "National Championship Games". The 1930 game in particular helped Pittsburgh legend Charley Hyatt cement his place in history by scoring 27 points, including a last second game-winning shot, at the defending national champions and assumed #1 squad Montana State.

Early-season national tournaments

Starting with the NCAA rule change regarding exempt tournaments in the 2006–07 season, Pitt has participated in an event every year.

Postseason

NCAA tournament results
The Panthers have appeared in the NCAA tournament 27 times. Their combined record is 25–28.

NCAA Tournament Seeding History
The NCAA began seeding the tournament with the 1979 edition.

NIT results
The Panthers have appeared in the National Invitation Tournament (NIT) nine times. Their combined record is 6–9.

CBI results
The Panthers have appeared in the College Basketball Invitational (CBI) one time. Their record is 5–1 and they were CBI champions in 2012.

Conference Championships

1932–33 Eastern Intercollegiate Champions
1933–34 Eastern Intercollegiate Champions
1934–35 Eastern Intercollegiate Champions
1936–37 Eastern Intercollegiate Champions
1980–81 Eastern 8 Tournament Champions
1981–82 Eastern 8 Tournament Champions
1986–87 Big East Regular Season Co-Champions
1987–88 Big East Regular Season Champions
2001–02 Big East Regular Season West Champions
2002–03 Big East tournament and Regular Season West Co-Champions
2003–04 Big East Regular Season Champions
2007–08 Big East tournament champions
2010–11 Big East Regular Season Champions

Pitt was the only team in Big East Conference history to reach the Big East Championship Game seven times in eight seasons having earned a trip to the title game in 2001, 2002, 2003, 2004, 2006, 2007, and 2008. Pitt played in the Eastern 8 Tournament Championship games in 1979, 1981, and 1982.

Individual awards & honors

National honors

National Player of the Year
Charley Hyatt won the National Player of the Year in 1929–30, he was the America's leading scorer that season (his second time as leading scorer) and made a last second basket to win the National Title Game with 27 points against what many considered the best team in the country.  This season was also to be the third consecutive time he had earned consensus All-American status (the second time he won the honor owing to him being in the inaugural class of consensus in his second season).

National Coach of the Year
 2001–02: Ben Howland won National Coach of the Year honors from the Associated Press, Naismith, USBWA, ESPN The Magazine, and The Sporting News.
 2008–09: Jamie Dixon won the Naismith Men's College Basketball Coach of the Year as well as the Jim Phelan Mid-season Coach of the Year award.
 2009–10: Jamie Dixon won the Jim Phelan National Coach of the Year Award.
 2010–11: Jamie Dixon won the Sporting News National Coach of the Year award.

Hall of Fame inductees

Three inductees represent the University of Pittsburgh in the Helms Foundation Basketball Hall of Fame; two of them, Carlson and Hyatt, are also represented in the Naismith Basketball Hall of Fame and the National Collegiate Basketball Hall of Fame. Both Carlson and Hyatt were selected as the first class inducted to each hall.
Henry Clifford "Doc" Carlson, M.D., Pitt head coach from 1922 to 1953.  He is noted as the innovator of the "figure 8" play, the first coach to take his team cross country and a leading advocate for intersectional games.  Despite great modern eras in Pitt basketball (late 1950s, mid 1970s, 1980s, 2000s), he continues to be the winningest coach in program history as well as the only one to lead the program to national championships.
Charley Hyatt, Pitt player and three-time All-American and two-time national scoring leader, he also was a senior year All American in High School and earned three other all-pro awards in the pre-NBA era playing after Pitt. He was a member of the very first Consensus All American team in 1929.
Don Hennon, two-time All-American (with one being a Consensus All American), led Pitt to two NCAA Tournament bids.

All Americans
Thirteen Pitt players have received All-American honors 14 unique season. Pitt players have been named First Team† All-Americans 15 times, Second Team All-Americans seven times, and Third Team All-Americans six times. In addition, players have been named as Freshman All-Americans four times and Honorable Mention All-Americans six times.  A Pitt player has achieved Consensus First Team All-American, as listed in the Official NCAA Records Book, on nine occasions. Charley Hyatt and Sykes Reed, who together lead Pitt to an undefeated national championship season, were Pitt's first Consensus All-Americans in 1928.  The other consensus first-team All-Americans include Don Smith, Claire Cribbs, Don Hennon, and DeJuan Blair. In addition, Don Hennon, Billy Knight and Jerome Lane received Consensus Second Team All-American status.

Honorable Mention All-Americans
1979 Sam Clancy, AP
1988 Charles Smith, AP, UPI
2003 Brandin Knight, AP
2004 Carl Krauser, AP

 
2008 Sam Young, AP
2009 Levance Fields, AP
2011 Ashton Gibbs, AP & Brad Wanamaker, AP

Freshman All-Americans
1978 Sam Clancy, Second Team
1985 Charles Smith, First Team
2004 Chris Taft, Second Team
2008 DeJuan Blair (consensus pick, but not for a particular team)

Academic awards
Two Pitt players have earned Academic All-American status from the College Sports Information Directors of America. Three Pitt players have earned the NCAA Postgraduate Scholarships which are awarded annually to select student-athletes who excel academically and athletically and who are in their final year of intercollegiate athletics competition.

Academic All-Americans
Peter Strickland, 1978
Joey David, 1986

NCAA Postgraduate scholarship winners
Thomas Richards, 1976
Joseph David, 1986
Darren Morningstar, 1992

Other awards
Orlando Antigua was selected as the USBWA Most Courageous Athlete in 1994.

Conference honors

Player of the Year
Charles Smith, 1987–88
Brandin Knight (co), 2001–02
DeJuan Blair (co), 2008–09

Most Improved Player
Ricardo Greer (co), 1999–00
Brandin Knight, 2001–02
Carl Krauser, 2003–04
Aaron Gray, 2005–06
Sam Young, 2007–08
Ashton Gibbs, 2009–10

Scholar-Athlete of the Year
Joe David, 1984–85
Darren Morningstar, 1991–92
Aaron Gray, 2006–07
Cameron Wright, 2013–14

Sportsmanship Award
Jaron Brown, 2003–04
Ronald Ramon (co), 2007–08
Brad Wanamaker, 2010–11

Coach of the Year
Ben Howland, 2001–02
Jamie Dixon, 2003–04
Jeff Capel, 2022-23

Rookie of the Year
Charles Smith, 1984–85
Sean Miller, 1987–88
Brian Shorter, 1988–89
Chris Taft, 2003–04
DeJuan Blair (co), 2007–08

Sixth Man of the Year
Nike Sibande, 2022-2023

Tournament MVP
Lennie McMillian, Eastern 8 1981
Clyde Vaughan, Eastern 8 1982
Julius Page, Big East 2003
Sam Young, Big East 2008

Conference stat champions

Scoring
Larry Harris won the Eastern 8 Scoring Title in the 1976–77 season (22.9 ppg).
Clyde Vaughan won the Big East Scoring Title in the 1982–83 season (22.0 ppg).

Rebounding
Sam Clancy won the Eastern 8 Rebounding Titles in both the 1978–79 (12.8 rpg) and 1979–80 (11.1 rpg) seasons.
Jerome Lane won the Big East Rebounding Titles in both the 1986–87 (14.0 rpg) and 1987–88 (11.6 rpg) seasons.
Isaac Hawkins won the Big East Rebounding Title in the 1997–98 season (9.7 rpg).
Aaron Gray won the Big East Rebounding Title in the 2005–06 season (10.5 rpg).
DeJuan Blair won the Big East Rebounding Title in the 2008–09 season (12.4 rpg).

Assist
Dwayne Wallace won the Eastern 8 Assist Title in the 1981–82 season (6.2 apg).
Darelle Porter won the Big East Assist Title in the 1989–90 season (7.6 apg).
Levance Fields won the Big East Assist Title in the 2008–09 season (7.5 apg).

University honors

Retired numbers

Four players have had their jersey numbers retired at Pitt.

Points club
41 total Panther players have achieved the 1,000 points club.  Of these, fourteen total Panther players have scored over 1,500 points in their career.  Two of these Panther players, Charles Smith and Clyde Vaughan, scored over 2,000 points in their career.

Stats updated through February 5, 2014.

2,000+ points
Charles Smith (1984–1988) 2,045
Clyde Vaughan (1980–1984) 2,033

1,500+ points

Larry Harris (1974–1978) 1,914
Sam Young (2005–2009) 1,884
Don Hennon (1956–1959) 1,841
Jason Matthews (1987–1991) 1,840
Ricardo Greer (1997–2001) 1,753
Ashton Gibbs (2008–2012) 1,748
Billy Knight (1971–1974) 1,731
Sam Clancy (1977–1981) 1,671
Carl Krauser (2002–2006) 1,642
Brian Shorter (1988–1991) 1,633
Vonteego Cummings (1996–1999) 1,581
Demetreus Gore (1984–1988) 1,555
Julius Page (2000–2004) 1,512

1,000+ points

Brandin Knight (1999–2003) 1,440
Lamar Patterson (2009–2014) 1,392
Jerry McCullough (1991–1996) 1,342
Sean Miller (1987–1992) 1,282
Bobby Martin (1987–1991) 1,282
Chevon Troutman (2001–2005) 1,274
Jaron Brown (2000–2004) 1,258
Levance Fields (2005–2009) 1,247
Jerome Lane (1985–1988) 1,217
Curtis Aiken (1983–1987) 1,200
Bob Lazor (1954–1957) 1,175
John Riser (1954–1957) 1,164
Kent Scott (1969–1972) 1,143
Isaac Hawkins (1996–2001) 1,127
Calvin Sheffield (1961–1964) 1,115
Brian Generalovich (1961–1964) 1,114
Aaron Gray (2003–2007) 1,109
Tray Woodall (2008–2013) 1,108
Donatas Zavackas (1999–2003) 1,099
Ronald Ramon (2004–2008) 1,096
Brad Wanamaker (2007–2011) 1,090
Talib Zanna (2009–2014) 1,089
Chris McNeal (1990–1993) 1,067
Carlton Neverson (1978–1981) 1,057
Julius Pegues (1955–1958) 1,050
Rod Brookin (1986–1990) 1,047
Gilbert Brown (2006–2011) 1,046
Darelle Porter (1987–1991) 1,007

NBA players

Pittsburgh Panthers have been selected 27 times in the NBA draft, 3 times in the ABA draft (Billy Knight was drafted by both the NBA and ABA in 1974). In addition,  11 former Panthers were selected in the CBA draft.  Seven Panthers have been selected as first-round NBA draft picks with Steven Adams being the most recent in 2013.

In addition, 48 former Panthers have played professionally in international basketball leagues. Clyde Vaughan especially stands out in averaging 28 points per game over his decade-long basketball career in Europe.

Season-by-season records

References

External links